Cereopsius sexmaculatus is a species of beetle in the family Cerambycidae. It was described by Per Olof Christopher Aurivillius in 1907. It is known from the Philippines, Malaysia, Borneo and Sumatra.

References

Cereopsius
Beetles described in 1907